SMS S21 was a V1-class torpedo boat of the Imperial German Navy. The ship was built by Schichau-Werke, at their Elbing shipyard, completing in 1913.  S21 served with the German High Seas Fleet during the First World War, and sank following a collision with the cruiser  on 21 April 1915.

Construction and design
The V1-class was a new class of torpedo boat intended to be smaller and more manoeuvrable than the Imperial German Navy's latest torpedo boats, which would be more suitable for working with the fleet. Twelve ships were ordered from AG Vulcan and Germaniawerft under the 1911 construction programme, while in 1912, twelve ships of similar design (S13–S24) were ordered from Schichau-Werke. The reduction in size resulted in the ships' seaworthiness being adversely affected, however, and range being reduced, with the 1911 and 1912 torpedo boats acquiring the disparaging nickname "Admiral Lans' cripples".

S21s armament consisted of two  SK L/30 naval guns in single mounts fore and aft, together with four 50 cm (19.7 in) torpedo tubes with one reload torpedo carried. Up to 18 mines could be carried. The ship had a crew of 3 officers and 71 other ranks. 

S21, yard number 872, was launched at Schichau's shipyard in Elbing, East Prussia (now Elbląg in Poland) on 11 January 1913 and was commissioned on 20 June 1913.

Service
In May 1914, S21 was a member of the 14th half-flotilla of the 7th Torpedo boat Flotilla. She remained part of the 14th half-flotilla at the outbreak of the First World War in August 1914. The 7th Torpedo Boat Flotilla supported the Raid on Yarmouth on 3 November 1914 and the Raid on Scarborough, Hartlepool and Whitby on 16 December 1914. On 21 April 1915, S21 was one of three torpedo-boats of the 14th half-flotilla that encountered the light cruisers of IV Scouting Group near the Weser estuary. The stern half of S21 remained afloat for some time, but attempts by the other two torpedo boats to take it in tow failed and the remains of S21 sank. 36 men were killed in the sinking of S21.

Notes

References

Bibliography
 
 
 
 
 
 

Torpedo boats of the Imperial German Navy
1913 ships
World War I torpedo boats of Germany
V1-class destroyers
Ships built in Elbing
Ships built by Schichau